The Edward R. Murrow Award is a journalism/communication honor extended by the Edward R. Murrow College of Communication of Washington State University.  

The award is for "commitment to excellence that exemplifies the career of Edward R. Murrow."  It may be for Lifetime Achievement or Distinguished Achievement, on a case-by-case basis.

Honorees 
, the honorees were:
 1997, Sam Donaldson, for Lifetime Achievement in Broadcasting
 1998, Frank Blethen, for Lifetime Achievement in Journalism
 1998, Walter Cronkite, for Lifetime Achievement in Broadcasting
 1998, Moriyoshi Saito, for International and Intercultural Communication
 1999, Al Neuharth, for Lifetime Achievement in Journalism
 1999, Keith Jackson, for Lifetime Achievement in Broadcasting
 2000, Ted Turner, for Lifetime Achievement in Communications
 2001, Bernard Shaw, for Lifetime Achievement in Broadcasting
 2002, Sir Howard Stringer, for International and Intercultural Communication
 2002, Christiane Amanpour, for Distinguished Achievement in Broadcasting
 2002, Daniel Schorr, for Lifetime Achievement in Broadcasting
 2003, Daniel Pearl, for Distinguished Achievement in Journalism
 2004, Peter Jennings, for Lifetime Achievement in Broadcasting
 2006, Tom Brokaw, for Lifetime Achievement in Broadcasting
 2007, David Fanning and FRONTLINE, for Distinguished Achievement in Journalism
 2008, Don Hewitt, for Lifetime Achievement in Broadcast Journalism
 2009, Bob Schieffer, for Lifetime Achievement in Broadcast Journalism
 2009, Helen Thomas, for Lifetime Achievement in Journalism
 2010, Deborah Amos, for Lifetime Achievement/Radio
 2010, Judy Woodruff, for Lifetime Achievement/Television
 2011, Ted Koppel, for Lifetime Achievement in Broadcast Journalism 

See reference for awards after 2011.

See also

 List of American television awards

References

External links
 Murrow Award Recipients.  Accessed September 24, 2011.

Murrow Award, Edward R.